NGC 2000 is an open cluster located in the constellation Mensa, in the Large Magellanic Cloud. It is around 160-165 thousand light-years away (160-165 pc away). It was discovered in 1836 by John Herschel.

References

Large Magellanic Cloud
Open clusters
2000
Discoveries by John Herschel
Astronomical objects discovered in 1836
Mensa (constellation)